David Taggart Dickinson  (August 13, 1867 – November 27, 1930) was a Massachusetts attorney and politician who served in the Massachusetts House of Representatives and as the twenty-eighth Mayor of Cambridge, Massachusetts.

Personal life 
Dickinson was born in Cambridge, Massachusetts to Alexander and Elizabeth (Taggart) Dickinson. He married Carrie M. Story of Manchester, New Hampshire on December 8, 1892. The couple had four children together.

Notes

1867 births
1930 deaths
Harvard Law School alumni
Mayors of Cambridge, Massachusetts
Republican Party members of the Massachusetts House of Representatives
Harvard College alumni